Onda Thana Mahavidyalaya is the general degree college in Murakata, Onda, Bankura district. It offers undergraduate courses in arts . This college was stablished in the year of 2007 vide Memo No 510 Edn (CS) dated 28.05.2007. It is affiliated to Bankura University.

Departments

Arts

Bengali
English
History
Philosophy
Sanskrit
Education
Geography
Physical Education
Political Science

Accreditation
The college is recognized by the University Grants Commission (UGC).

See also

References

External links
Onda Thana Mahavidyalaya

Colleges affiliated to Bankura University
Universities and colleges in Bankura district
Educational institutions established in 2007
2007 establishments in West Bengal